Sir Hector Maclean, 7th Baronet of Morvern (about 1760 – 2 November 1818) was the 23rd Clan Chief of Clan Maclean who died before he had any children, and the title passed to his half brother.

Biography
He was born in 1783 to Donald Maclean of Brolas. Donald Maclean of Brolas was the great-grandson of Donald MacLean, 1st Laird of Brolas. Sir Hector became the 23rd Clan Chief of Clan Maclean on the death of Sir Allan Maclean, 6th Baronet, who died without an heir. In his earlier years Sir Hector served in the army, but during the greater portion of his life he lived a retired life. He died without an heir on 2 November 1818, and was succeeded as Clan Chief by his half brother, Sir Fitzroy Jeffreys Grafton Maclean, 8th Baronet.

Ancestors

References

1760s births
1818 deaths
Hector
Hector
Baronets in the Baronetage of Nova Scotia
Maclean, Hector, 3rd Lord
19th-century British businesspeople